Paul Émile Berton (May 4, 1846 in Chartrettes, Seine-et-Marne – February 15, 1909 in Paris) was a French landscape painter.

He is sometimes confused with the French Art Nouveau painter, poster designer and lithographer Paul Berthon (March 15, 1872 in Villefranche-sur-Saône, death date and place unknown). 

In the arts trade many lithographs by Paul Berthon are often attributed to Paul Émile Berton.

References 
 Thieme/Becker 1907–1950, Vol. 3 (1909), p. 510 (as: Berton, Paul Emile)

External links 
Arcadja

French landscape painters
1846 births
1909 deaths
People from Seine-et-Marne